Paul Cunningham may refer to:
Paul Cunningham (chef) (born 1969), English chef working in Denmark
Paul Cunningham (footballer) (born 1986), New Zealand footballer
Paul Cunningham (journalist), Irish journalist and author
Paul Cunningham (minister) (1937–2020), minister in Church of the Nazarene
Paul Cunningham (politician) (1890–1961), U.S. Representative from Iowa
Paul R. Cunningham (born 1949), Jamaican American surgeon and medical educator
Paul Cunningham (rugby union), Irish rugby union player and coach